Tekken is a series of fighting video games produced by Namco. 

Tekken may also refer to:
 Tekken (video game), the first game in the series
Tekken 2
Tekken 3
Tekken Tag Tournament
Tekken 4
Tekken 5
Tekken 6
Tekken Tag Tournament 2
Tekken 7
Tekken 8
 Tekken: The Motion Picture, a 1998 animated film based on the series
 Tekken (2009 film), a live-action film based on the series
 Tekken: Blood Vengeance, a 2011 animated film based on the series
 Tekken (2018 video game), a mobile game
 Tekken (1990 film), a Japanese film by Junji Sakamoto